Miodrag “Mile” Kos (Serbian Cyrillic: Миодраг Миле Кос; 20 September 1925 – 1 September 2014) was a Serbian footballer, coach and sportswriter.

References

External links

1925 births
2014 deaths
Yugoslav footballers
Yugoslav football managers
Serbian football managers
Serbian journalists
OFK Beograd managers
NK Čelik Zenica managers
PAOK FC managers
FK Partizan non-playing staff
Association football goalkeepers